The Division I Group A tournament was held in Ventspils, Latvia, from March 25 to 31. The winner, the Czech Republic, was promoted to the top division for 2013, while the bottom-ranked team, Kazakhstan, was relegated to Group B for 2013.

Group B was contested from April 9 to 15 at Hull, Great Britain. The winner, Denmark, moves up to Group A for 2013, while the last placed team Italy is relegated to Division II Group A. Denmark won the three way tie-breaker with France and China by virtue of having a superior goal differential in the games those three nations played against each other (Denmark +3, China +1, France −4).  Relegation was decided in similar fashion, by breaking a three way tie between Great Britain (+4), the Netherlands (−1), and Italy (−3).

In 2011 these tournaments were known as Division I and Division II.

Group A

All times are local UTC+3.

Statistics and awards

Scoring leaders 
GP = Games played; G = Goals; A = Assists; Pts = Points; +/− = Plus-minus; PIM = Penalties In Minutes
Source: IIHF.com

Goaltending leaders 
(minimum 40% team's total ice time)

TOI = Time on ice (minutes:seconds); GA = Goals against; GAA = Goals against average; Sv% = Save percentage; SO = Shutouts
Source: IIHF.com

Directorate Awards
Goaltender: Radka Lhotská, 
Defenseman: Trine Martens, 
Forward: Denise Altmann, 

Source: IIHF.com

Group B

All times are local UTC+1.

Statistics

Scoring leaders 
GP = Games played; G = Goals; A = Assists; Pts = Points; +/− = Plus-minus; PIM = Penalties In Minutes
Source: IIHF.com

Goaltending leaders 
(minimum 40% team's total ice time)

TOI = Time on ice (minutes:seconds); GA = Goals against; GAA = Goals against average; Sv% = Save percentage; SO = Shutouts
Source: IIHF.com

Directorate Awards
Goaltender: Shi Yao, 
Defenseman: Charlotte Densing, 
Forward: Sun Rui, 
Source: IIHF.com

References

External links
Group A
Group B
Complete results at Passionhockey.com

I
2012
2012
IIHF Women's World Championship Division I
World
Latvian